Madhvani is a surname. Notable people with the surname include:

Mayur Madhvani (born 1945), Ugandan businessman
Muljibhai Madhvani (1894–1958), Indian-born Ugandan businessman
Nimisha Madhvani (born 1959), Ugandan diplomat
Ram Madhvani, Indian film director

See also
Madhvani Group, a Ugandan conglomerate